Sir Frederick Martin Williams, 2nd Baronet  (25 January 1830 – 3 September 1878) was a politician in the United Kingdom. He was Conservative Member of Parliament (MP) for Truro in Cornwall from 1865 until his death in 1878.

Personal life
He was the son of Sir William Williams, (1791 – 24 March 1870), of the Williams family of Caerhays and Burncoose, the first Baronet (Williams of Tregullow) and his wife Caroline Eales. In 1858 he married Miss Mary Christian Law, the granddaughter of Dr George Henry Law, formerly Bishop of Bath and Wells.

An estimated 2,000 people attended his funeral at Gwennap where he was buried in the family vault. His residence was at Goonvrea in the parish of Perranarworthal and the family seat was at Tregullow near Scorrier House. Sir Frederick bequeathed all his real and personal estate to his widow (estimated at under £160,000) and the large freehold property, of Tregullow to his heir, Sir William Williams, 3rd Baronet, of Tregullow. An Order of the High Court of Justice required the lease of the Prince of Wales Quarry at Trewarner Down in the Manor of Tintagel, which was owned by the deceased, to be sold at auction on 30 August 1880. The quarry included the only beam engine in north Cornwall, which hauled stone from the pit and drained the quarry. The beam engine was expensive when installed in July 1871 for £1,590 4s.

Cornish Bank
Sir Frederick Williams was a major shareholder of the Cornish Bank with a one-third share. The Cornish Bank "closed its doors" on Saturday, 4 January 1879, following persistent rumours, that following his death, his property and resources would be withdrawn from the bank. The bank issued a circular on 27 December 1878 in an attempt to dispel the rumours claiming they were making arrangements to replace Sir Frederick's share of the capital. One rumour was that Sir Frederick was overdrawn on his account by £80,000 and consequently, the creditors became alarmed and there was a run on the Bank on Wednesday, 1 January. The bank had branches in Falmouth, Penryn, Redruth and Truro with the first one established in either 1770 or 1771 in Boscawen Street, Truro.

References

External links
 
 
 

1830 births
1878 deaths
Baronets in the Baronetage of the United Kingdom
Deputy Lieutenants of Cornwall
Members of the Parliament of the United Kingdom for Truro
UK MPs 1865–1868
UK MPs 1868–1874
UK MPs 1874–1880
Conservative Party (UK) MPs for English constituencies